Fast Food Fast Women is a 2000 American romantic-comedy/vehicular-action film written and directed by Amos Kollek and financed by French and Italian production companies. The tag line for the film was "There are 18 million people in New York City, but only one like Bella." It was entered into the 2000 Cannes Film Festival.

Cast
 Anna Thomson as Bella
 Jamie Harris as Bruno
 Louise Lasser as Emily
 Robert Modica as Paul
 Lonette McKee as Sherry-Lynn
 Victor Argo as Seymour
 Angelica Torn as Vitka
 Austin Pendleton as George
 Sandrine Holt as Giselle
 Valerie Geffner as Wanda
 Mark Margolis as Graham
 Judith Roberts as Bella's Mother
 Lynn Cohen as Jesse
 Salem Ludwig as Leo
 Irma St. Paule as Mary-Beth

References

External links 
 

2000 films
English-language French films
2000 romantic comedy films
Films directed by Amos Kollek
2000s English-language films
2000s French films